Keen Records was an American independent record label, founded by John and Alex Siamas in 1957 in Los Angeles. John Siamas was a successful businessman in the aerospace industry, and, as a music aficionado, started Keen as a side business.  They owned two other labels, Ensign and Andex, which shared the same numbering system with Keen. Bob Keane (later of Del-Fi Records) was with the label in its early days, but departed in late 1957.

There was also a short-lived budget album label called "Famous" that reissued Keen material.  The Famous albums were issued in the early 1960s, but it was likely owned by the same people, though it is not absolutely certain.

Robert "Bumps" Blackwell was the A&R man. It was a black pop label, featuring Sam Cooke and Johnny "Guitar" Watson.

See also
 Sam Cooke
 List of record labels

References

External links
Keen/Andex/Famous Labels Album Discography

American independent record labels
Record labels established in 1957
Rhythm and blues record labels
Blues record labels